The Maine Public Utilities Commission is a government agency that regulates water, electric, natural gas, and telecommunications in the state of Maine.  The commission also oversees ferries and water taxis in Casco Bay.

The three full-time commissioners are nominated by the governor, reviewed by the legislature’s Joint Standing Committee on Utilities and Energy and confirmed by the full senate, for staggered terms of 6 years. The governor designates one commissioner as chairman. The commissioners make all final commission decisions by public vote or action of the majority. The current chairman is Phil Bartlett.

References

External links
 Maine Public Service Utilities Website

Maine
Public Utilities
Government of Maine